Kalvøy or Kalvøya may refer to:

Places
Kalvøya, Bærum, an island in Bærum municipality in Viken county, Norway
Kalvøya, Lillesand, an island in Lillesand municipality in Agder county, Norway
Kalvøya, Nærøysund, an island in Nærøysund municipality in Trøndelag county, Norway
Kalvøy, Stavanger, an island in Stavanger municipality in Rogaland county, Norway
Kalvøya, Steinkjer, a peninsula in Steinkjer municipality in Trøndelag county, Norway
Kalvøya, Svalbard, an island in Svalbard, Norway

See also
Kalvø, a small, uninhabited island in southeastern Denmark